

The Most Exalted Order of the White Elephant is an order of Thailand. It was established in 1861 by King Rama IV of the Kingdom of Siam. Along with the Order of the Crown of Thailand, it is regularly awarded to any government official for services rendered to Thailand for five years, making it Thailand's most-commonly awarded order.

Classes
The order consists of eight classes:

Gallery

Old designs

Current designs

Selected recipients
 
 Emperor Napoleon III - Knight Grand Cross (1851, Custom Design)
 Be Biauw Tjoan, Majoor-titulair der Chinezen – Knight (1895)
Plaek Phibunsongkhram - Knight Grand Cordon
 Sultan Ibrahim of Johor - Knight Grand Cordon
 Sultan Abdul Hamid Halim Shah of Kedah - Knight Grand Cordon
 Chavalit Yongchaiyudh - Knight Grand Cordon
 Sarit Thanarat - Knight Grand Cordon
 Thanom Kittikachorn - Knight Grand Cordon 
 Praphas Charusathien - Knight Grand Cordon 
 Phin Choonhavan - Knight Grand Cordon 
 Prem Tinsulanonda - Knight Grand Cordon 
 Chatichai Choonhavan - Knight Grand Cordon 
 Prayut Chan-o-cha - Knight Grand Cordon
 Surayud Chulanont - Knight Grand Cordon 
 Arthit Kamlang-ek - Knight Grand Cordon 
 Fuen Ronnaphagrad Ritthakhanee - Knight Grand Cordon
 Phao Siyanon - Knight Grand Cordon 
 Chakthip Chaijinda - Knight Grand Cordon 
 Somyot Poompanmoung - Knight Grand Cordon 
 Thanasak Patimaprakorn - Knight Grand Cordon 
 Pongsapat Pongcharoen - Knight Grand Cordon 
 Apirat Kongsompong - Knight Grand Cross
 Pornpipat Benyasri - Knight Grand Cordon 
 Chatchai Sriworakan - Knight Grand Cordon 
 Chalermpol Srisawat - Knight Grand Cross
 Udomdej Sitabutr - Knight Grand Cordon 
Luechai Rutdit - Knight Grand Cordon 
 Naris Pratumsuwan - Knight Grand Cordon 
 Airbull Suttiwan - Knight Grand Cross
 Manat Wongwat - Knight Grand Cross
 Prince Paribatra Sukhumbandhu - Knight Grand Cordon
 Prince Bhanurangsi Savangwongse - Knight Grand Cordon 
 Prince Narisara Nuwattiwong - Knight Grand Cordon 
 Prince Damrong Rajanubhab - Knight Grand Cordon 
 Prince Chula Chakrabongse - Knight Grand Cordon 
 Prince Chakrabongse Bhuvanath - Knight Grand Cordon 
 Prince Suphayok Kasem - Knight Grand Cordon (Special Class)
Na Arreenich - Knight Grand Cordon 
 Alexander I of Yugoslavia - Knight Grand Cordon
 Bob Hawke - Knight Grand Cordon 
 Albert du Roy de Blicquy
 Norodom of Cambodia - Knight Grand Cross
 John T. Cole - Knight Commander
 Pakubuwono X - Knight Grand Cross (1929)
 Try Sutrisno - Knight Grand Cross 
 Widodo Adi Sutjipto - Knight Grand Cross 
 Feisal Tanjung - Knight Grand Cross 
 Maraden Panggabean - Knight Grand Cross 
 Abdul Haris Nasution - Knight Grand Cross (1960) 
 R.E. Martadinata - Knight Grand Cross 
 Hamengkubuwono IX - Knight Grand Cross 
 Endriartono Sutarto - Knight Grand Cross 
 L. B. Moerdani - Knight Grand Cross
 Sumitro Djojohadikusumo - Knight Grand Cross
 Mohamed Bolkiah - Knight Grand Cross 
 Jefri Bolkiah - Knight Grand Cordon 
 Mahathir Mohamad - Knight Grand Cordon (1981) 
 Abdullah Ahmad Badawi - Knight Grand Cross (1994) 
 Miklós Horthy - Knight Grand Cross
 The Earl Mountbatten of Burma - Knight Grand Cross
 Foster C. LaHue
 Ramon Magsaysay, 1955.
 Sir Samuel Robinson, 1923.
 Graves B. Erskine - Knight Grand Cross
 Arne Skaug.
 Pierra Vejjabul
Joseph J. Cappucci - Knight Commander (Second Class)
David John Collins Awarded by King Rama V in 1897 (Fourth Class)
Frederick William Verney - Commander
Queen Victoria
General William Westmoreland - Knight Grand Cross
Vice Admiral Józef Unrug
Major General Richard Secord
 Jiri Sitler - Knight Grand Cross (2006)
 Lieutenant Commander Saman Kunan - Knight Grand Cross (2018)
 Kirill Mikhailovich Barsky - Knight Grand Cross (2019)

See also

References

External links

 The Most Exalted Order of the White Elephant, Secretariat to the Cabinet of Thailand

White Elephant, Order Of The
White Elephant, Order Of The
White Elephant, Order Of The
1861 establishments in Siam